Shenandoah is a borough in Schuylkill County in the Coal Region of Pennsylvania. It is distinct from Shenandoah Heights, which is part of West Mahanoy Township immediately to the north. As of 2021, the borough's population was 4,247.

History
The area that ultimately became Shenandoah was first settled by a farmer named Peter Kehley in 1835. Kehley cleared a patch of land at the center of the valley and built a log cabin and maintained his farm for about 20 years in total isolation. He sold his claim to the Philadelphia Land Company, which in anticipation of the opening of coal mines in the area, laid out the town in 1862.

Booming growth occurred during the Civil War years caused by the development and opening of several anthracite coal mines. The area was incorporated as a borough in 1866 and was a famous hotbed of activity during the era of the Molly Maguires in the 1870s.

After the original influx of English, Welsh, Irish, and German immigrants a large influx of people from central, eastern and southern European countries such as Poland, Lithuania, and Italy occurred in the decades before and after the turn of the 20th century.  By 1920, the town had a population of nearly 30,000 residents. The community was hard hit by the decline of the anthracite coal industry after World War II and heavy emigration by coal miners occurred in order to find work elsewhere.

In Schuylkill County Court, January 1902, those interested filed their petition for retail, wholesale, bottling or brewing licenses at the Office of the Clerk of the Court. Shenandoah was represented with bars and breweries. This coal town offered more bars per thousand people than any other location in the world. 

The Lehigh Valley Railroad Station served as the main passenger terminal in Shenandoah, but because of the coal industry, it was not the only railroad to service Shenandoah. The town was also served by the Pennsylvania Railroad and Reading Railroad, making Shenandoah the only borough in Pennsylvania to be served by three railroad companies.

During the Great Coal Strike of 1902 the Pennsylvania National Guard was called into Shenandoah to keep the peace and curb rioting by angry miners. The strike would only be resolved after President Theodore Roosevelt intervened.

Shenandoah, the rise and fall of the coal industry, and the dismantling of the Molly Maguires was one of the subjects examined by George Leighton in his 1939 book Five Cities: The Story of Their Youth and Old Age.

Shenandoah Valley was featured in the documentary 2012 film "Shenandoah, Pennsylvania" exploring the hate crime murder of Luis Ramirez and the local police attempting to cover it up.

Etymology 
The origin of the name Shenandoah is much debated. One theory holds that Shenandoah received its name from an Indian word meaning 'sprucy stream' or 'river flowing alongside high hills and mountains'. Another origin theory is that the town was named after the Shenandoah Valley in Virginia. The Virginia valley in turn took its name from an Iroquoian word meaning 'deer'.

Geography
Shenandoah is located at  (40.819753, -76.202883).

It has a warm-summer humid continental climate (Dfb) and average monthly temperatures range from 25.0 °F in January to 69.5 °F in July. PRISM Climate Group at Oregon State University The hardiness zone is 6a.

Demographics
As of the census of 2010, there were 5,071 people, 2,213 households, and 1,213 families residing in the borough. There were 3,112 housing units, with 28.9% vacant.  The racial makeup of the borough was 86.3% White, 1.7% Black, 0.4% Native American, 0.3% Asian, 8.7% some other race, and 2.7% from two or more races. Hispanic or Latino of any race were 16.7% of the population.

As of the census of 2000, there were 5,624 people, 2,649 households, and 1,380 families residing in the borough. The population density was ). The racial makeup of the borough was 97.40% White, 0.34% African American, 0.25% Native American, 0.36% Asian, 0.04% Pacific Islander, 1.01% from other races, and 0.60% from two or more races. Hispanic or Latino of any race were 2.76% of the population.

There were 2,649 households, out of which 20.0% had children under the age of 18 living with them, 32.5% were married couples living together, 13.5% had a female householder with no husband present, and 47.9% were non-families. 42.9% of all households were made up of individuals, and 26.0% had someone living alone who was 65 years of age or older. The average household size was 2.07 and the average family size was 2.84.

In the borough the population was spread out, with 19.0% under the age of 18, 7.5% from 18 to 24, 23.3% from 25 to 44, 21.8% from 45 to 64, and 28.5% who were 65 years of age or older. The median age was 45 years. For every 100 females, there were 84.1 males. For every 100 females age 18 and over, there were 80.6 males.

The median income for a household in the borough was $18,714, and the median income for a family was $26,910. Males had a median income of $24,289 versus $19,783 for females. The per capita income for the borough was $12,562. About 16.2% of families and 20.1% of the population were below the poverty line, including 32.3% of those under age 18 and 16.1% of those age 65 or over.

Notable people
 Joseph Awad – poet, painter and public relations executive. National president of the Public Relations Society of America, Poet Laureate of Virginia.
 Al Babartsky (19 April 1915 – 29 December 2002) – collegiate and professional American football player. He was one of the Seven Blocks of Granite at Fordham University.
 Francis Brennan (7 May 1894 – 2 July 1968) – the first American to receive an appointment to the Roman Curia.
 John Cavosie – National Football League player.
 Walter Ciszek – Jesuit priest and Russian GULAG survivor. Presently under consideration for possible beatification by the Roman Catholic Church and titled Servant of God.
 Anthony P. Damato – United States Marine and Medal of Honor recipient.  A United States Navy  was named in honor of Corporal Damato.
 John Morgan Davis (9 August 1906 – 8 March 1984) – Lieutenant Governor of Pennsylvania from 1959 to 1963.
 Jimmy Dorsey – jazz musician and bandleader.
 Tommy Dorsey – jazz musician and bandleader.
 Leo Katalinas – National Football League player.
Herschel Levit – professor, artist, designer, author.
 Nicholas Marsicano- painter and teacher of the New York School.
 Ron Mattes – National Football League player.
 Al Matuza (11 September 1918 – 16 May 2004) – National Football League player.
 Rear Admiral Mary Joan Nielubowicz – Director of the United States Navy Nurse Corps.
 Darryl Ponicsan – author and screenwriter, The Last Detail, Cinderella Liberty.
 Abner Charles Powell (15 December 1860 – 7 August 1953)- professional baseball player, manager, owner and innovator.
 Frank Racis – National Football League player.
 Walter Slowakiewicz – fourth bishop of the Eastern Diocese of the Polish National Catholic Church
 Barney Wentz – National Football League player.
 Jerry Wolman - former owner of Philadelphia Eagles of NFL and Philadelphia Flyers of NHL.
 Nellie King - MLB pitcher and broadcaster for the Pittsburgh Pirates

Local Media 
The Pottsville Republican – Herald, daily newspaper, name merged from the Pottsville Republican and Shenandoah Evening Herald.
 The Hazleton Standard-Speaker, daily newspaper, name merged from the Standard Sentinel (morning paper) and Plain Speaker (evening paper).
 WCDH 91.5FM, licensed to Shenandoah, with a Contemporary Christian music format.
 Locally owned WMBT 1530 on the AM dial served the community from 1963 to 2003.
 The Shenandoah Sentinel, online local newspaper.

Churches
St Michael Greek Catholic Church (Ruthenian Catholic Church) was first of that denomination in the United States.  On 21 November 1886, the church was dedicated to Saint Michael the Archangel. The new parish was started four years earlier when a group of seventy Galician and Subcarpathian Ruthenian families gathered together and agreed to petition the Ruthenian Catholic Metropolitan of Galicia. 

St. George Lithuanian Roman Catholic Church is the oldest Lithuanian parish in the United States. The Lithuanian parish was established in 1872, and the church was built in 1891. The church was demolished in 2010 by the decision of Diocese of Allentown and against the wishes of parishioners.

St. Casimir Roman Catholic Church is listed as one of the oldest Polish parish in the United States.

Gallery

See also
George Bretz (photographer), who did a famous series of underground photographs of the old Kohinoor Mine here, in 1884.

References

External links
 Downtown Shenandoah, Inc.
 J.W. Cooper Community Center
 Popalis Family History; Shenandoah History and Image Gallery
 The Greater Shenandoah Area Historical Society
 

Populated places established in 1820
1820 establishments in Pennsylvania
Municipalities of the Anthracite Coal Region of Pennsylvania
Boroughs in Schuylkill County, Pennsylvania
Coal towns in Pennsylvania